Krake (German for "octopus") is a steel Dive Coaster roller coaster at Heide Park in Soltau, Lower Saxony, Germany manufactured by Bolliger & Mabillard. It is the first roller coaster of its kind in Germany. The attraction officially opened to the public on April 16, 2011.

History

Speculation that Heide Park would be getting a new roller coaster began in late 2009 after it was revealed that the park was working on a project code named "Ungetüm 2011" (translates to "Monster 2011"). In September 2010, track pieces from manufacture Bolliger & Mabillard began to be delivered to the park which then led to rumours that the new roller coaster would be a Dive Coaster. On October 31, 2010, Heide Park officially announced Germany's first Dive Coaster, Krake.

Construction was handled by RCS, a German construction company. Beginning with the splashdown area, construction later progressed into the Immelman loop and station areas. In late January 2011, the final piece of track (top of the first drop) was installed. After testing and a ribbon cutting ceremony, Krake opened on April 16, 2011.

After the original advertised octopus mouth (where riders would drop through) that was to be placed at the bottom of the first drop was never built, the public began to question why the park didn't follow through with what they advertised. In response, the mouth was constructed during the following off-season.

Experience

Queue
Krake's queue is divided into two sections. The first section is only used during busier days and isn't paved, but rather filled in with gravel. The second section is a paved path that leads the roller coaster's station.

Ride

Krake is based on a pirate theme and features riders being "eaten" by an octopus.

Once the floor drops and the front gate opens, the train is dispatched straight into the  lift hill. Once at the top, the train continues going straight for a short period before making a left turn into the holding brake. At the bottom, the train enters the "monster's" mouth, followed by a splashdown. Then, the train goes through an Immelmann loop. After going over an airtime hill, the train makes a banked right turn into the final brake run. The train makes a left turn into the brake run before entering the station. One cycle lasts just under two minutes.

Characteristics

Track
The colour of the track is black while the supports are dark brown.

Trains
Krake operates with three floorless steel and fiberglass trains. Each train has three cars that can seat six riders in a single row for a total of 18 riders per train. The seats are black and each have a brown over-the-shoulder restraint. On each train, there are a pair of tubes that allow the water to be shot into the air as the train reaches the bottom of the first drop. Also, the trains for the roller coaster were manufactured in Switzerland.

Reception
Jurnan Schilder's review from Theme Park Tourist was mostly positive but said that the story of the ride could have been further improved, "[The story] could have been developed more fully to improve the waiting experience and to make the rollercoaster make a little more sense", and overall rated the roller coaster four out of five stars for its "wow" factor.

Awards

The roller coaster has never placed in Amusement Today's Golden Ticket Awards.

See also
 2011 in amusement parks

References

External links
 

Heide Park
Roller coasters in Germany
Dive Coasters manufactured by Bolliger & Mabillard
Roller coasters operated by Merlin Entertainments